Dilation (or dilatation) may refer to:

Physiology or medicine

 Cervical dilation, the widening of the cervix in childbirth, miscarriage etc.
 Coronary dilation, or coronary reflex
 Dilation and curettage, the opening of the cervix and surgical removal of the contents of the uterus
 Dilation and evacuation, the dilation of the cervix and evacuation of the contents of the uterus
 Esophageal dilatation, a procedure for widening a narrowed esophagus
 Pupillary dilation (also called mydriasis), the widening of the pupil of the eye
 Vasodilation, the widening of luminal diameter in blood vessels

Mathematics 
 Dilation (affine geometry), an affine transformation
 Dilation (metric space), a function from a metric space into itself
 Dilation (operator theory), a dilation of an operator on a Hilbert space
 Dilation (morphology), an operation in mathematical morphology
 Scaling (geometry), including:
 Homogeneous dilation (homothety), the scalar multiplication operator on a vector space or affine space
 Inhomogeneous dilation, where scale factors may differ in different directions

Chemistry and physics 
 Thermal expansion of crystalline triglycerides is referred to as dilation
 Scale invariance, a feature of objects or laws that do not change if length scales (or energy scales) are multiplied by a common factor
 Time dilation, the observation that another's clock is ticking at a slower rate as measured by one's own clock

Music

 Dilate (Bardo Pond album)
 Dilate (Ani DiFranco album)
 Dilate (musical project), ambient solo project of Vampire Rodents keyboardist Victor Wulf
 Dilation (album), 2011 album by comedian Rory Scovel

See also
 Dilution (disambiguation)